The 2003 World Weightlifting Championships were held in Vancouver, Canada from 14 November to 22 November. The men's +105 kilograms division was staged on 21 and 22 November 2003.

Schedule

Medalists

Records

Results

References
Weightlifting World Championships Seniors Statistics, Page 52 
Results 

2003 World Weightlifting Championships